Mohammed Rikan Hadid al-Halbousi (born 4 January 1981) is an Iraqi Sunni politician who currently serves the Speaker of the Council of Representatives of Iraq from 15 September 2018. Al Halbousi submitted his resignation from this role on 26 September 2022 due to the political tension at the time. This resignation was however rejected by the parliament on 28 September 2022 and he still retains this position. He was previously the governor of Al Anbar Governorate since 29 August 2017. He is the leader of Progress Party.

Al Halbousi won a seat in the Iraqi 2014 parliamentary elections and has been serving an MP ever since. On August 29, 2017, the Anbar Provincial Council voted by a majority vote to elect Halbusi Al Anbar governor.

Biography 
Mohammed Rikan Hadid Al-Halbousi Al-Dulaimi was born to a Sunni family on January 4, 1981, in Garmah, western Iraq. He is married to Nawar Asim, PhD. He  holds a degree in Highways and Roads Engineering from Al-Mustansiriya University in Baghdad. He received a BSc. Degree in summer 2002, a year before Iraq war that was waged on March 20, 2003. Al Halbusi moved on to pursue his graduate studies at Al-Mustansiriya University where he received a master's degree in Highways and Roads Engineering in 2006. His MSc. thesis subject title is "Modeling of Pedestrian-Vehicle Conflict on Arterial Street Using the Simulation Approach".

Al Halbousi launched his own private business working as a businessperson. He has been owning and running Al-Hadeed Co. Ltd. for General Rebuilding Projects. Al-Hadeed Company has implemented a number of infrastructure projects in Fallujah city with particular mention to the designing and implementation of the Fallujah sewage matrix. Al Halbousi remained active in his private business until he was tapped to get into the world of Iraqi politics in early 2014.

Speaker of the Council of Representatives 
On September 2018, Halbousi was elected as the  Speaker of the Council of Representatives making him the 11th to serve that position and the 6th since the 2003 invasion. He won  169 votes in a secret ballot conducted at the session of the 329-seat assembly.

On 9 January 2022, Halbousi was elected as the Speaker of Council of Representatives for a second term, defeating Mashahadani, a former speaker of the first parliament set in 2006. Halbousi won with 200 votes, according to a statement from 329-seat parliament.

References

1975 births
Living people
Governors of Al Anbar Governorate
Iraqi politicians
People from Al Anbar Governorate
Iraqi Sunni Muslims
Speakers of the Council of Representatives of Iraq